Always Watching: A Marble Hornets Story is a 2015 American found footage supernatural horror film directed by James Moran and starring Chris Marquette, Jake McDorman, Doug Jones, Alexandra Breckenridge and Alexandra Holden. In some countries it was retitled as Marble Hornets: The Operator. The film was released on video on demand on April 7, 2015, and opened in select theaters on May 15, 2015.

The movie is a film adaptation of the YouTube web series Marble Hornets inspired by the Slender Man online mythos.

Plot
The movie starts with Eli (Brendon Huor) fleeing through the woods with Jamie (Mickey Facchinello), who is holding a camera. Jamie stops when she realizes that Eli has disappeared. She searches for him, but instead spots The Operator (Doug Jones), a tall, faceless creature in a suit. She reaches and starts the car, but is blocked by Eli standing still in front of it. He suddenly rushes to Jamie's door and bashes his head through the door's window, before dragging Jamie out of the car and pulling her to the ground. A loud crack is heard before the tape abruptly cuts off.

Milo (Chris Marquette) is a member of a news reporting team and has a crush on his coworker, Sara (Alexandra Breckenridge). However, Charlie (Jake McDorman), an Ivy League graduate, has just transferred to the team, upsetting Milo and his chances of getting with Sara. The three are tasked with investigating the mysterious disappearance of a man named Dan (Michael Bunin). Milo is tasked with investigating a series of Mini-DVR tapes that Dan shot. After some analysis, he begins finding images of the Operator in the tapes.

While watching the tapes, he is struck by an odd power outage. Eventually, Milo finds the Operator Symbol, a circle with an "x" through it, engraved into his neck. Then, the Operator appears in his backyard. Milo demands that he leave, but he instead teleports closer to Milo, and Milo reenters his house. He eventually flees to Sara's home, interrupting her and a shirtless Charlie, which angers Charlie. Charlie eventually forces a screaming Milo out of the house. He refuses to go home and decides to sleep in his car.

The following day, he returns home and finds Charlie in an upstairs bedroom. Charlie angrily confronts Milo over the months of footage he has of Sara going about her day. Sara comes in and is disgusted by what she sees, and Milo begins to panic. Charlie refuses to let him touch a camera, and Milo then tells him to grab the camera and look around. Through the camera, Charlie sees the closet door flying open, and The Operator rushing towards him. Charlie panics and drops the camera, and all three take off from the house.

Later, they turn the camera on to find an Operator Symbol inside Milo's car. The three go on the run, trying to escape the Operator and find out what happened to Dan and his family. Eventually, Charlie's informant tells him that Dan used his money to purchase a home in a new location. However, they discover that the house has been burnt down. They locate a storm shelter with a working camera feed that caught everything going on in the house. The feed reveals that Dan smothered his daughter Tara (Morgan Bastin) before being killed himself by his wife Rose (Alexandra Holden), who then burned the house down.

They then go to the local sheriff (George Back), who informs them that Rose survived the fire and that she is locked up in an asylum. The three manage to contact Rose, who proceeds to calmly inform them that she believes the monster came into their life because Dan became interested in it. However, when she sees the Operator Symbol on Sara's arm, she attacks her. Sara, Milo, and Charlie are forced to leave while medical staff restrains Rose.

Completely out of options, they decide to make a last stand in a cabin. After setting the whole place up with cameras, Milo notices that the camera picked up a detail he missed at the hospital: Rose's mark was gone. The crew is then attacked by The Operator. Milo hangs himself, believing that if he dies, Charlie and Sara will be safe. The Operator seemingly leaves after Milo dies, but Milo's dead body suddenly rises from the ground like a zombie. It grabs a pipe and beats Charlie to death before catching and killing Sara. Milo then falls to the floor, his eyes a solid white. Moments later, The Operator appears, and his movements seemingly loop. He then vanishes, and Milo's eyes return to normal.

The movie ends with Dan and Rose leaving a sale, where Dan has purchased a camera with a "college project tape" inside, presumably a tape from the student film-within-a-film of the original Marble Hornets webseries.

Cast
Chris Marquette as Milo Burns
Jake McDorman as Charlie MacNeel
Doug Jones as The Operator aka Slender Man
Michael Bunin as Dan Wittlocke
Alexandra Breckenridge as Sara
Alexandra Holden as Rose Wittlocke
Morgan Bastin as Tara Wittlocke
Elizabeth Payne as Barbara Sellers
Damon Gupton as Leonard Herring
Tim Seitter as Dean
Mark Christopher Lawrence as Gary Rockwell
Rick Otto as Sheriff Lee Dylan
David Pevsner as Kyle
Kathryn Gordon as Makaela
Cynthia Murell as Mary
George Back as Sheriff Reggie Deakins
Mary Payne Moran as Peggy the Waitress
Angus Scrimm as Percy
Andrew Zaozirny as Grocery Store Checkout Clerk
Mickey Facchinello as Jamie
Brendon Huor as Eli
Blair Bomar as Nikki
Graham Clarke as Everett
Shashawnee Hall as Dennis Baru
Adrian Sparks as Farmer Jerry
Steve Berens as Cop

Reception

Critical reception for Always Watching was predominantly negative. Dread Central gave the movie a mixed review, writing, "For fans, it will be a fun little bonus story that lets you down in the substance department. For people looking for a fun horror movie, it won’t be super memorable, but will give you a good time. If you don’t think about it too much and just experience it, it is quite fun. As a film/horror nerd, I was let down, but general audiences will like this a whole lot. It did enough interesting to earn my respect, but too much wrong for my adoration. A solid good time, but not a masterpiece." One of the most common complaints about the film was that it failed to live up to the original web series, despite having a much higher budget.

That said, CBR spoke rather highly of Always Watching in a retrospective piece published in 2022, seven years after the film's initial release. The article favorably compared Always Watching to other feature films based on the Slender Man mythos, such as the 2018 Sony release Slender Man: "As a standalone film set in the same universe, Always Watching enriches the world of Marble Hornets, giving established fans new lore to chew on by showing that The Operator's horrifying machinations went well beyond what [series protagonist Jay Merrick] and the gang experienced. At the same time, though, you don't have to have seen Marble Hornets to understand Always Watching, meaning there's no barrier to entry for newcomers who just want to watch a Slender Man movie."

See also

 Slender Man (film)
 Beware the Slenderman (film)
Slender: The Eight Pages
Slender: The Arrival
 Urban legend

References

External links

2015 films
2010s supernatural horror films
American supernatural horror films
2015 horror films
Found footage films
Films based on web series
Slender Man
2010s English-language films
2010s American films